Hedinichthys is a genus of the stone loaches endemic to China. It has been regarded as a subgenus of Triplophysa.

Species
There are currently three recognized species in this genus:
 Hedinichthys grummorum Prokofiev, 2010
 Hedinichthys macropterus (Herzenstein, 1888) 
 Hedinichthys yarkandensis (F. Day, 1877) (Kashgarian loach)

References

Nemacheilidae
Fish of Asia